Ysselsteyn is a village in the municipality of Venray in Limburg, Netherlands. It was established in 1921 and named after its designer, Hendrik Albert van IJsselsteyn, then Minister of Agriculture. Ysselsteyn has an extensive hog raising industry.

The Catholic St Oda Church is a square aisleless church with ridge turret. In 1944, it was damaged by war and rebuilt in 1947. In 1975, a carillon was built next to the church.

References

External links 
 

Populated places in Limburg (Netherlands)
Venray